Amma Donga is a 1995 Indian Telugu-language action comedy film directed by Sagar starring Krishna, Soundarya, Indraja, Aamani and Kota Srinivasa Rao. Koti scored and composed the film's soundtrack.

The film follows a daring young man who after being framed for multiple murders sets out to find the convicts and clear his name. Released on 12 January coinciding with Sankranti festival, the film went on to be a superhit at the box office.

Cast 
 Krishna Ghattamaneni as Chakradhar
 Soundarya as PadmaPriya
 Aamani as Alivelu
 Indraja as Mohana Kalyani
 Kota Srinivasa Rao as Kotayya
 Mallikarjuna Rao as Balaraju
 Tanikella Bharani as Sattipandu
 Srihari
 Brahmanandam

Soundtrack 

The film had its soundtrack album scored and composed by Koti.

 "Edho Manasu" — Mano, K. S. Chitra, S. P. Sailaja
 "Taha Taha" — S. P. Balasubrahmanyam, K. S. Chitra
 "Neetho Sayantram" — S.P.B., K. S. Chitra, Sailaja
 "Bolo Krishna" — S.P.B., K. S. Chitra
 "Jum Jummaney" — S.P.B., K. S. Chitra
 "Pill Adaraho" — Mano, Swarnalatha

References

External links 

1995 films
1990s Telugu-language films
1995 action comedy films
Indian action comedy films
Films scored by Koti